The 1997 2 Hours of Donington was the first ever race in the new International Sports Racing Series.  It took place at Donington Park, United Kingdom on July 6, 1997.

Official results
Class winners in bold.

External links

 World Sports Racing Prototypes - Results

D
6 Hours of Donington
International Sports Racing Series Donington